Irrlicht may refer to:

 Irrlicht, the German name for will-o'-the-wisp, the ghostly light sometimes seen at night over bogs and swamps
 "Irrlicht", the ninth song in the Winterreise cycle by Franz Schubert
 Irrlicht (album), by Klaus Schulze
 Irrlicht Engine, a 3D computer graphics engine
 Die Irrlichter, a German mediaval/fantasy/folk band
 Irrlicht (film), a 1919 German silent film